Robin Bannerman Jeffrey  is a Canadian-born professor. His primary research interest is the modern history and politics of India, especially with reference the northern area of Punjab and Kerala in the south. He is also interested in Indian media studies and development studies.

Life
Robin Jeffrey was born in Canada. He studied first at the University of Victoria, British Columbia, Canada, from where he graduated with a BA degree. He was awarded a D.Phil. in modern Indian history by the University of Sussex, England, in 1973 and had previously worked as a school teacher in Chandigarh, India, for the Regional Institute of English and the Canadian University Service Overseas between 1967 and 1969. His first employment had been in 1963 as a sports writer for a small daily newspaper in Canada.

Jeffrey took up a position as a research fellow at the Australian National University upon completion of his doctorate. He has taught at that institution in Canberra during two different periods. He taught politics at La Trobe University, Melbourne, Australia, between 1979 and 2005, where he became a professor. In 2002, he was elected a Fellow of the Australian Academy of Social Sciences, having been previously elected a Fellow of the Australian Academy of the Humanities in 1994.

, Jeffrey is an Emeritus Professor of La Trobe University and the Australian National University. He chairs an advisory panel of the Australia India Institute within the University of Melbourne, Australia. He was a visiting research professor at the Institute of South Asian Studies, based at the National University of Singapore, since 2009.

In 2011, when concentrating on media and development studies, Jeffrey said that

Publications
Jeffrey's published works include:

Author
 – his DPhil thesis

 (co-authored with Assa Doron and published by Hatchette in India as Cell Phone Nation)
Waste of a Nation: Garbage and Growth in India. Cambridge, MA: Harvard University Press, 2018 (co-authored with Assa Doron).

Editor
Media and Work in China and India (co-editor with Ronojoy Sen)
 (with Ronojoy Sen and Pratima Singh)
 (with Edward Aspinall and Anthony Regan)
 (co-editor with Ronojoy Sen)

See also
ANU Research School of Pacific and Asian Studies

References

External links
Curriculum vitae, as of 2010

Living people
20th-century Canadian historians
Canadian male non-fiction writers
Historians of India
Academic staff of the Australian National University
Academic staff of the National University of Singapore
Alumni of the University of Sussex
Academic staff of La Trobe University
Fellows of the Australian Academy of the Humanities
Fellows of the Academy of the Social Sciences in Australia
Academic staff of the University of Melbourne
University of Victoria alumni
Year of birth missing (living people)
Historians of Kerala
21st-century Australian historians